Taphrosaurus is an extinct genus of plesiosaur.

See also

 List of plesiosaur genera
 Timeline of plesiosaur research

References

Late Cretaceous plesiosaurs of North America
Taxa named by Edward Drinker Cope